Tuskegee, Alabama is a city in the United States.

Tuskegee may also refer to:

Tuskegee (album), a 2012 album by American soul singer Lionel Richie
Tuskegee (Cherokee town), a village site in Tennessee, U.S., the childhood home of Sequoyah
Tuskegee (Martian crater)
Tuskegee (YTB-806), a United States Navy Natick-class large harbor tug
Tuskegee Railroad, built in 1860
Tuskegee University, formerly known as the Tuskegee Institute, in Tuskegee, Alabama

See also
Tuskegee Airmen (disambiguation)

Taskigi Mound, a precolumbian archaeological site in central Alabama
Tuckasegee (disambiguation)